The list of shipwrecks in 1890 includes ships sunk, foundered, grounded, or otherwise lost during 1890.

January

2 January

3 January

13 January

14 January

18 January

22 January

23 January

24 January

25 January

26 January

28 January

Unknown date

February

10 February

11 February

16 February

21 February

22 February

25 February

28 February

Unknown date

March

1 March

12 March

28 March

Unknown date

April

21 April

23 April

26 April

29 April

Unknown date

May

5 May

14 May

15 May

19 May

21 May

23 May

25 May

July

11 July

13 July

23 July

26 July

28 July

31 July

August

7 August

8 August

17 August

18 August

September

1 September

6 September

18 September

25 September

October

1 October

11 October

14 October

17 October

19 October

28 October

31 October

November

6-7 November

10 November

19 November

21 November

23 November

25 November

December

1 December

3 December

11 December

15 December

23 December

25 December

26 December

Unknown date

Unknown date

References

1890